C.I.D. (刑警2人组) is a Singaporean police drama which aired in 2006 on MediaCorp Channel 8. It stars Tay Ping Hui, Qi Yuwu, Apple Hong, Jeanette Aw, Ong Ai Leng, Brandon Wong and Zhang Yaodong as the cast of this series.

The series was directed by Chong Liung Man (张龙敏) and starred Tay Ping Hui and Qi Yuwu in the main lead roles. Five years later, Chong would go on to direct award-winning police blockbuster C.L.I.F., which also features Tay and Qi in the main roles as colleagues in the CID. Rare for a locally produced drama, certain scenes were filmed on location outside Southeast Asia; there were several scenes which took place in Taiwan and were filmed in the country itself.

Cast
Tay Ping Hui as Chen Long 陈龙 (Sean)
Qi Yuwu as Tang Siwei 唐思伟
Ivy Lee as Ye Xue 叶雪, Chenghui's wife
Jeanette Aw as Fang Jiayi 方佳宜 (Tang Sijie)
Brandon Wong as Zhang Zhihua 张志华
Ong Ai Leng as Lin Yaoshan 林耀珊 (013)
Zhang Yaodong as Wu Guoxiong 吴国雄 ("Ah Boy")
Apple Hong as Long Liwen 龙丽雯

Supporting cast
Ye Shipin as Xiang Dahai 向大海
Shaun Chen as Lin Chenghui 林成辉
Nick Shen as Fly
John Cheng as Wu Jianbiao 阿标
Regene Lim as Lin Hongxi 林小汐, Chenghui and Ye Xue's daughter
Rayson Tan as Supt Huang, Siwei's boss
Richard Low as Fang Honglie 方鸿烈/Fang Qiang, Jiayi's father
Jin Yinji as Chen Fengjiao 陈凤娇, Sean's mother
Zhu Houren as Tang Jiannian 唐健年, Siwei's father
Lin Meijiao as Sun Lifeng 孙丽凤, Siwei's mother
Constance Song as Tata/Dawn
Allan Wu as Steve Chong
Belinda Lee as Lu Xiaofen 陆晓芬, Steve's wife
Alan Tern as Zhang Jiasheng 张家声
Yang Libing as Liu Cailian
Yan Bingliang as Lin Zaifa 林再发, coffee shop boss
Chen Tianwen as Li Fuzhong
Romeo Tan as Billy
Elyn Chong as Eve
Cheryl Chan as Tana
Huang Wanxian as Suki Tan

Cameo
Pan Lingling as He Meiyun, Tang Jiannian's ex-lover
Li Jiaxun as younger Tang Siwei

Synopsis
Sean is a CID officer and team leader. Together with his elite team of investigators, Zhang Zhihua, Lin Yaoshan and Wu Guoxiong, and forensic scientist Fang Jiayi, they tackle several cases.

The first case involves a string of triad execution-style murders tied with the notorious local triad. They are traced to a man called Tang Siwei, who is a member of Xiang Dahai's gang. Xiang Dahai ("Hai-ge") is a notorious "ah long" and head of the local syndicate. Recently, one of his men Lin Chenghui has been down on his luck and had several operations and gambling dens shut down. His partner is Tang Siwei, whom the CID has been tracking down. The murder count keeps piling up and evidence shows Tang Siwei is not the killer. The police manage to close down the syndicate and arrest Hai-ge. To Sean's shock, Siwei is actually a fellow CID officer who went undercover as a gang member as part of a dangerous covert operation to crack down on the local triads. After Chenghui was killed by another triad member, Siwei took it upon himself to help Chenghui's widow out guilt and compassion but did not disclose his occupation so that they would accept his help.

Tang Siwei's boss decides to transfer him to Sean's team. Although highly competent and intelligent, his aloof and seemingly anti-social nature makes the rest of the team feel uncomfortable. Sean and Siwei's relationship got off to a terrible start as they had locked horns several times before Siwei's transfer. Eventually, Siwei earns his colleagues' respect and is well-regarded by Sean. Siwei meets Fang Jiayi, the resident forensic expert, and mistook her for his missing sister. Unknown to the both of them, Siwei's mother and Jiayi's father have been hiding a deep dark secret for almost two decades.

The team are called to a case involving a suspected suicide attempt. Sean's university mate Steve was found dead in Sean's car. The breaks had been tampered with and Steve had no reason to commit suicide. After hitting several dead ends, they trace a lead to a mysterious young Thai woman with an equally mysterious background.

Lin Chenghui's wife works at the local neighbourhood coffee shop. The boss, Lin Zaifa, has a very public affair with Liu Cailian, one of the waitresses. She and her husband Li Fuzhong have a very complex relationship. Frustrated by his wife's looseness, Fuzhong often takes out his anger on Cailian's daughter Qingqing. The impudent Cailian is oblivious of all the gossip she has been raising and of the fact that Zaifa has attempted to molest her daughter and continues to humiliate Fuzhong publicly. Sean's mother offers to take in the girl but she disappears one night. Qingqing's decomposing corpse was found in the woods but the team keeps hitting a dead end with each suspect.

Chenghui's younger brother Chenggong has been getting into trouble lately by roaming around the HDB estates with some fellow school drop-outs and delinquents. Sean and his team find it difficult to rein them in as they have little or no regard for authority. Meanwhile, Jiayi has been persistently trying to dig up her past and realises that she is not Fang Honglie's biological daughter. She later receives some news that will change her life forever.

Awards & Nominations
The other drams that are nominated for Best Drama are Love at 0 °C 爱情零度C, Rhapsody in Blue 蓝色仙人掌, Measure of Man 大男人，小男人 & The Shining Star 星闪闪

See also
 Crime in Singapore
 Criminal Investigation Department (Singapore)
 C.L.I.F.
 C.L.I.F. 2
 C.L.I.F. 3
 C.L.I.F. 4

References

External links
CID (English)

Singapore Chinese dramas
2006 Singaporean television series debuts
2006 Singaporean television series endings
Singaporean crime television series
Singapore Police Force
Channel 8 (Singapore) original programming